David Kohn (born 3 October 1972) is a British architect. His practice, David Kohn Architects, is based in London and works internationally on arts, education and residential projects.

Established in 2007, the practice has won a number of awards including Young Architect of the Year 2009 from Building Design magazine and INSIDE World Interior of the Year in 2013.

Kohn was born in Cape Town and studied architecture at the University of Cambridge and at Columbia University GSAPP, New York, as a Fulbright Scholar. He taught architecture at the Sir John Cass School of Art, Architecture and Design, between 2003 and 2013 and was a Visiting Professor at KU Leuven between 2014 and 2016.

Kohn is a Fellow of the Royal Society of Arts and a Trustee of Stratford Circus Arts Centre.

Education
 1997 MA and Diploma in Architecture, Jesus College, Cambridge University
 1994 BA (Hons) Architecture, Jesus College, Cambridge University

Significant buildings
(2008) Flash at the Royal Academy of Arts, London
(2009) Stable Acre, Norfolk
(2010) Skyroom, London
(2011) Thomas Dane Gallery, Mayfair, London
(2012) Carrer Avinyó, Barcelona
(2012) The White Building, Hackney Wick, London
(2012) A Room for London, Living Architecture
(2014) Sotheby's S|2, London
(2012–2020) Institute of Contemporary Arts, London
(2015–2021) New Campus Savile Road, New College, Oxford
(2017–2018) V&A Photography Centre,

References

External links

1972 births
Alumni of Jesus College, Cambridge
Architects from London
Columbia Graduate School of Architecture, Planning and Preservation alumni
Living people
People from Cape Town